The Church of Saint Mary the Virgin is an Episcopal Anglo-Catholic church in Midtown Manhattan, New York City, which is part of the Episcopal Diocese of New York of the Episcopal Church in the United States of America. The church complex is located in the heart of Times Square at 133-145 West 46th Street, with other buildings of the complex at 136-144 West 47th Street, between Sixth and Seventh Avenues. It is colloquially known as "Smoky Mary's" because of the amount of incense used in the services.

Completed in 1895, the church has been called "one of the finest Gothic-inspired designs of New York's late 19th century". It was designated a New York City landmark in 1989 and added to the National Register of Historic Places in 1990. In 2021, it reported 366 members, average attendance of 0, and $624,150 in plate and pledge income.

History

Original church

The Society of the Free Church of Saint Mary the Virgin in the New York City was incorporated on December 3, 1868. Thomas McKee Brown wanted to build a church in New York City dedicated to expressing the full witness of Catholic thought in ritual and teaching within the Episcopal Church. A year after his ordination, Brown brought his plan to the Bishop of New York, Horatio Potter, who suggested that a church was needed near Longacre Square – which was renamed Times Square in 1905 – on the west side of what is now Midtown. John Jacob Astor gave three lots on West 45th Street between Seventh and Eighth Avenues, "stipulating that the Church should be free, and positively orthodox in management and working."

On April 6, 1868, the cornerstone was laid for the first church, located at 228 West 45th Street, which is today the site of the Booth Theatre. The rector and trustees named the church for the Blessed Virgin Mary. The first church was designed by William T. Hallett, and was dedicated on December 8, 1870, the Feast of the Conception of the Blessed Virgin Mary. Potter was unable to officiate at the service, but his place was taken by Horatio Southgate, the Episcopal Church's former missionary bishop to the Ottoman Empire.

After the Episcopalians left the church on West 45th Street, it became the Lutheran Church of the Redeemer and then Fifth Church of Christ, Scientist.

New church

By 1890, the congregation had outgrown the church on West 45th Street. In 1892, the late Miss Sara L. Cooke, a member of the parish, left the church a legacy which eventually amounted to $700,000, in addition to real estate. Brown and the other trustees decided to use this legacy to fund a new church on an eight-lot parcel running through from 46th to 47th Streets. The new complex was to include a rectory at the 47th Street end of the lot, a clergy house for curates and assistants and a mission house for the sisters. The style would be French Gothic of the 13th and 14th centuries, with a church seating 800 people.

Erecting this building was a challenge to the architectural firm of Napoleon LeBrun & Sons, with Pierre LeBrun as the lead designer, because of its size and the location. The LeBrun firm had experience working with steel framing, which is buried within the walls, making it the first church in the world built on a concealed steel skeleton, "redefining the conventional methods of church construction." The facade of the church is clad in limestone, while the other buildings in the complex are brick-faced.

The cornerstone for the new church was laid on December 8, 1894, and the church was dedicated in 1895. Complementing LeBrun's design were many sculptural decorations by J. Massey Rhind.

Today
Today, Saint Mary's is known for its solemn liturgies and choral and organ music. Solemn High Mass and Solemn Evensong and Benediction are celebrated on Sundays, and Mass is offered daily. Because of the copious use of incense, the church is sometimes referred to as "Smoky Mary's". In 1996-97, the interior of the church was restored by J. Lawrence Jones & Associates, resulting in vivid colors, including cobalt blue vaulting with gold stars.

Music 

The choir of the Church of Saint Mary the Virgin is a professional ensemble that sings music for the liturgy. At each Solemn Mass, the plainchant is sung in the original Latin. The choir's repertoire of Masses and motets stretches from the Middle Ages to works by living composers.

A number of musicians have served as organist and music director at the parish, among them McNeil Robinson, Kyler Brown, Christopher Babcock, Robert McCormick, James Kennerley, and Simon Whalley.  The current organist and music director is David Hurd.

See also

 List of New York City Designated Landmarks in Manhattan from 14th to 59th Streets
 National Register of Historic Places listings in Manhattan from 14th to 59th Streets
 High church
 Oxford Movement
 Donald L. Garfield
 Grieg Taber
 Granville M. Williams SSJE rector 1930-1939

References

External links

 
 New York Architecture Images Midtown - St Mary the Virgin - 12 images plus a short history
 Historical documents on the parish from Project Canterbury

1868 establishments in New York (state)
19th-century Episcopal church buildings
Anglo-Catholic church buildings in the United States
Churches completed in 1894
Churches in Manhattan
Episcopal church buildings in New York City
Gothic Revival church buildings in New York City
Limestone churches in the United States
Napoleon LeBrun buildings
New York City Designated Landmarks in Manhattan
Properties of religious function on the National Register of Historic Places in Manhattan
Religious organizations established in 1868
Stone churches in New York City
Times Square buildings